Ubiškė is a town in Telšiai County, Lithuania. According to the 2011 census, the town has a population of 187 people.

References

Towns in Lithuania
Towns in Telšiai County
Telšiai District Municipality
Shavelsky Uyezd